Claire L. Straith (1891–1958) was an American plastic surgeon.

Straith was a pioneer of Automobile safety. He  described the cranial and facial injuries created by the dashboards and windshields in case of a car crash and advocated the use of seat belts  and padded dashboards 

According to Joel W. Eastman, author of Styling Vs. Safety: The American Automobile Industry and the Development of Automotive Safety 1900-1966, University Press of America, ©1984,

Straith gained the attention of Walter P. Chrysler, and the knobs and handles of the 1937 Dodge were designed for safety. Some of Straith's ideas were to be incorporated into the 1948 Tucker Sedan.

Notes and references

External links
The Straith Clinic

1891 births
1958 deaths
American plastic surgeons
Automotive safety pioneers
20th-century surgeons